Semice is a municipality and village in Nymburk District in the Central Bohemian Region of the Czech Republic. It has about 1,300 inhabitants.

Economy
Semice is home to the Bramko Semice company, which is the largest grower and supplier of potatoes and vegetables in the country.

References

Villages in Nymburk District